Kondar may refer to:

Places

 Iran
 Kondar, Chaharmahal and Bakhtiari
 Kondar, Qazvin
 Kondar, South Khorasan

 Tunisia
 Kondar, Tunisia

Other uses
 Kondar, a Scheduled Tribe of India

See also
 Kandar (disambiguation)
 Kandor (disambiguation)
 Kondor (disambiguation)